Mathura Das Mathur (6 September 1918 – 14 April 1993) was an Indian politician from Rajasthan. He was born at Jodhpur and studied at Lucknow University. He joined Indian National Congress. In 1948, he became the Health and Education minister of the first government of Marwar state. He was elected to the 2nd Lok Sabha from Nagaur in 1957. He was the Home Minister in the Rajasthan government from 1962–67. He was the First Chief Whip in the Rajasthan Legislative Assembly from 1952-1957.

References 
 Mathuradas Mathur

Rajasthani politicians
India MPs 1957–1962
1918 births
People from Jodhpur
1993 deaths
University of Lucknow alumni
Lok Sabha members from Rajasthan
People from Jodhpur district
Indian National Congress politicians from Rajasthan